Steven Alexzander Horsford (born April 29, 1973) is an American politician and businessman serving as the U.S. representative for Nevada's 4th congressional district since 2019, previously holding the position from 2013 to 2015. A member of the Democratic Party, he served in the Nevada Senate, representing the 4th district, in Clark County, from 2005 to 2013. Horsford was the first African American to serve as Majority Leader (2009–2013) and the first African American to represent Nevada in Congress. He lost to the Republican nominee in 2014.

After that election, Horsford joined an international Las Vegas-based business and marketing consulting firm, R&R Partners, for which he had worked before his political career. In January 2018, he announced that he would run for the open seat vacated by Democrat Ruben Kihuen in the midterm elections. In November 2018, he defeated former U.S. Representative Cresent Hardy in a rematch of their 2014 race.

Early life and education
Horsford was born and raised in Las Vegas, Nevada. His mother, Pamela Horsford, came to the U.S. from Trinidad in her teens and gave birth to him when she was 17. While attending Ed W. Clark High School in Las Vegas, Horsford worked at Pizza Hut and at a veterinarian's office, where he cleaned kennels after hours.

When Horsford was 19, his father, Gary Shelton, was killed. One report states that Shelton "was shot and killed at work by a man who had tried to rob the store" in North Las Vegas at which he worked as a cook, while another report says he "was killed in a drug incident". After his father's death, Horsford temporarily returned home from the University of Nevada, Reno, where he had been studying political science and communications. He returned to college the next year. Horsford received a degree from the University of Nevada, Reno, in 2014.

Business career
Horsford was CEO of the Culinary Training Academy, a job training program. He also served on the Southern Nevada Workforce Investment Board. In 1996, he began working at R&R Partners in Las Vegas.

Nevada Senate

Elections
In 2004, incumbent Democratic State Senator Joe Neal, from Clark County's 4th Senate district, decided to retire to run for a seat on the Clark County Commission. Horsford ran and defeated Republican Mabel Florence Lucier, 72%–28%. He became the fourth African American to serve as a state senator since the Nevada legislature first convened in 1864. In 2008, he was reelected to a second term with 74% of the vote.

Tenure
Horsford served in six special sessions and four regular sessions of the Nevada legislature. In February 2009, he became Nevada Senate majority leader.

In August 2011, Horsford appointed Senator Mo Denis to lead the caucus election efforts for the 2012 election cycle.

In November 2009, a Las Vegas television station caught Horsford illegally parking his SUV with his personalized license plate "State Senator 17" in a handicapped parking space at a park for six hours. The mother of a disabled child noticed the car. Horsford apologized, saying, "There was no excuse. It should have never happened." He said that he had made a donation to a nonprofit group in the amount that he would have been fined had he been caught by law enforcement.

In the summer of 2010, Horsford sent a fundraising letter from his PAC soliciting donations in exchange for private meals or receptions to meet with various Democratic legislative leaders and Senate committee chairs. After criticism that the letter amounted to "pay to play", he apologized and discontinued the solicitation program.

In 2011, web poker company PokerStars treated Horsford to a trip to the Bahamas before the introduction of legislation that would benefit the online gaming industry. Horsford said, "It was productive. They made a good presentation." He received $37,500 in campaign contributions from PokerStars. The PokerStars PAC reported making contributions to 48 Nevada lawmakers in 2010. Horsford and some other legislators later returned the contributions.

Committee assignments
In his last session in the Nevada Senate, he served as chair of the Senate Finance Committee and also served on the Senate Committee on Revenue and the Senate Committee on Legislative Operations and Elections.

U.S. House of Representatives

Elections

2012 

In October 2011, Horsford announced he would run for Congress, but did not know at the time which district he would run in because the Nevada legislature had not finished the redistricting maps. He decided to run in the newly created 4th congressional district, which includes the northern portion of Clark County as well as all or part of the rural counties of Lincoln, White Pine, Nye, Esmeralda, Mineral and Douglas.

Horsford was due to face former state Assemblyman John Jay Lee in the Democratic primary, but Lee dropped out in November, effectively handing Horsford the nomination. He defeated Republican businessman Danny Tarkanian in November, 50%–42%. Tarkanian won the district's rural counties by margins of better than 2-to-1, but Horsford carried Clark County, home to four-fifths of the district's voters, by 28,800 votes.

2014 

Horsford was narrowly defeated by Republican state Assemblyman Cresent Hardy, who in 2016 also lost reelection after a single term.

2018 

Horsford announced in January 2018 that he would run to replace retiring incumbent Ruben Kihuen in Nevada's 4th congressional district. Kihuen declined to run for a second term after sexual harassment allegations. Horsford won the June Democratic primary, defeating Pat Spearman and Amy Vilela, and defeated Republican nominee Cresent Hardy again in the general election. He was sworn in on January 3, 2019.

2020 

Horsford ran for reelection against Republican former state Assemblyman Jim Marchant. In the November general election, Horsford defeated Marchant by five points.

2022 

Horsford won reelection in 2022. He ran unopposed in the Democratic primary.

Horsford's wife, Sonya, expressed displeasure that Horsford was running for reelection despite having admitted to a decade-long affair with a former college student and intern, saying, "This election cycle, I will not be silent" and "We just want to heal and live the amazing lives we've been destined to live, free of lies, manipulation, and unbridled ambition."

Horsford defeated Republican Sam Peters by a margin of about 5%.

Tenure
Horsford's two-year term began on January 3, 2013. He did not resign from the Nevada Senate, as it would not be in session before the end of his term on February 4, 2013. He is a member of the House Progressive Caucus, and the only caucus member to support the September 30, 2013, continuing resolution that contained a one-year delay of the Affordable Care Act's individual mandate.

Political positions

As of June 2022, Horsford had voted in line with Joe Biden's stated position 100% of the time.

On February 9, 2023, Horsford voted against H.J.Res. 24: Disapproving the action of the District of Columbia Council in approving the Local Resident Voting Rights Amendment Act of 2022, which condemns the District of Columbia's plan to allow noncitizens to vote in local elections.

COVID-19 policy
On January 31, 2023, Horsford voted against H.R.497:Freedom for Health Care Workers Act, which would lift COVID-19 vaccine mandates for healthcare workers.

On February 1, 2023, Horsford voted against a resolution to end the COVID-19 national emergency.

Immigration
Horsford was an original co-sponsor of H.R.15, which would have created a pathway to citizenship for undocumented immigrants. He has said that Congress needed to address immigration as a whole, not just young people living in the country illegally. He said increased border security with Mexico and Canada was needed, but that a southern border wall would not solve the immigration problem.

First impeachment of President Trump
On December 18, 2019, Horsford voted for both articles of impeachment against President Donald Trump, including abuse of power and obstruction of Congress.

Health care
Horsford "sees healthcare as a right, not a privilege". He believes that all Americans should have health care of the sort veterans and senior citizens receive.

Gun control
Horsford supports a gun control package that would include background checks, a ban on assault weapon and bump stocks, banning private sales and closing the gun show loophole, an increase in mental-health funding and programs to address bullying in schools. Asked in May 2018 about gun confiscation, he said, "I believe we have to be very careful under the Second Amendment not to take away someone’s right, but to be clear, assault rifles and weapons of war are not the same as other forms of weapons, and we need to be very careful and make a clear distinction."

Federal lands
During his first term in Congress, Horsford worked on "an agreement that allowed for the designation of the Tule Springs Fossil Beds National Monument and the designation of about 50,000 acres of wilderness in north-central Nevada." He does not support the transfer of federal land in Nevada to state control, saying, "Nevada hasn’t been able to properly fund education. How is it going to be able to manage 87 percent of public lands that are now currently managed by BLM, Forest Service and wildlife? Let’s be realistic about our priorities and let’s continue being partners."

Israel
Horsford has described the controversy about the relocation of the U.S. Embassy to Jerusalem as "a distraction away from the important international issues we are right now faced with."

Minimum wage
Horsford supports an increase in the federal minimum wage. In March 2014, as part of a "constituent outreach effort", he went undercover to help a UPS driver deliver packages, partly "to get a from-the-ground perspective of the working man and woman in Las Vegas" and partly "to argue for raising the federal minimum wage from $7.25 per hour to $10.10."

Supreme Court
Horsford voted against S. 4160: Supreme Court Police Parity Act of 2022. The bill would provide extra security to Supreme Court justices after recent doxing concerns, and an alleged assassination attempt against Justice Brett Kavanaugh.

Reparations
Horsford is a sponsor of H.R. 40, the Commission to Study and Develop Reparation Proposals for African Americans Act. The bill would set up a reparations commission for those with enslaved ancestors.

Syria
In 2023, Horsford voted against H.Con.Res. 21, which directed President Joe Biden to remove U.S. troops from Syria within 180 days.

Committee assignments
Committee on Financial Services (118th Congress)
Committee on Ways and Means (116th-117th Congress)
Subcommittee on Health
Committee on the Budget

Caucus memberships
Congressional Black Caucus (chair)
Congressional Progressive Caucus
New Democrat Coalition
Problem Solvers Caucus
 House Pro-Choice Caucus

Other political activities

2008 presidential election
Horsford was active in arranging for Nevada to host the second national presidential caucus in 2008. He was an early supporter of Barack Obama's candidacy, co-chairing Obama's campaign in the state.

National committees
Horsford was the national vice chairman of the Democratic Legislative Campaign Committee and served as the Democratic National Committeeman for the State of Nevada. He is a member of the Democratic National Committee's Change Commission and its Rules & Bylaws Committee.

Career between House terms
In April 2015, Horsford resumed working at R&R Partners. As an officer there, he oversaw an effort to help MGM Resorts International ensure that it kept its word to officials in Prince George's County, Maryland, that at least half of the workforce for the MGM National Harbor in Maryland would be made up of residents of that county and that the MGM National Harbor would contract with minority-owned firms.

Personal life
Horsford is married to Sonya Douglass Horsford, a professor of educational leadership at Teachers College, Columbia University. They married in 2000 and have three children.

He is a member of Alpha Phi Alpha fraternity.

Horsford had six-way open heart bypass surgery in 2013 to treat a hereditary condition.

In May 2020, Horsford acknowledged an extramarital affair with Gabriela Linder, a former intern of Senator Harry Reid. Linder, 15 years younger than Horsford, said the relationship lasted from 2009, when she was a 21-year-old college student and he was majority leader in the Nevada state senate, until April 2020. It was sexual, she said, only from 2009 to 2010 and 2017 to 2019. Linder said that Horsford "offered her financial support, introduced her to political connections and filmed a segment for her young son's YouTube show using his congressional staff." Horsford acknowledged transferring money in 2019 from his company to his then-mistress.

See also

List of African-American United States representatives

References

External links

 Congressman Steven Horsford official U.S. House website
 Campaign website
 

 
Senator Steven A. Horsford at the Nevada State Legislature (2007)

|-

|-

|-

|-

1973 births
21st-century American politicians
African-American members of the United States House of Representatives
African-American state legislators in Nevada
African-American people in Nevada politics
American people of Trinidad and Tobago descent
Democratic Party members of the United States House of Representatives from Nevada
Living people
Democratic Party members of the Nevada Assembly
Democratic Party Nevada state senators
Politicians from Carson City, Nevada
Politicians from Las Vegas
University of Nevada, Reno alumni
21st-century African-American politicians
20th-century African-American people